The  is the prefectural parliament of Nara Prefecture.

Members
As of 19 October 2019

References

External links 

Official website (Japanese)

Prefectural assemblies of Japan
Politics of Nara Prefecture